Thomas Francis Pritchard (18 June 1904 – 1968) was an English professional footballer who played in the Football League for Charlton Athletic,  and Mansfield Town, Newport County, Preston North End, Stockport County, Thames and Wolverhampton Wanderers.

References

1904 births
1968 deaths
English footballers
Association football defenders
English Football League players
Wolverhampton Wanderers F.C. players
Stockport County F.C. players
Newport County A.F.C. players
Charlton Athletic F.C. players
Thames A.F.C. players
Olympique de Marseille players
Lancaster City F.C. players
Mansfield Town F.C. players